The Chevron B23 is a Group 5 sports prototype race car, designed, developed and built by British manufacturer Chevron, in 1973. Over its racing career, spanning 12 years, it won a total of 12 races (plus 15 additional class wins), scored 41 podium finishes, and clinched 2 pole positions. It was powered by a naturally-aspirated  Ford-Cosworth DFV Formula One engine, producing .

References

Chevron racing cars
Sports prototypes
24 Hours of Le Mans race cars
Sports racing cars